Varennes-sur-Amance (literally Varennes on Amance) is a commune in the Haute-Marne department in north-eastern France. Between 1972 and 2012 it was part of the commune Terre-Natale. It was the place of birth of novelist and critic Marcel Arland.

See also
Communes of the Haute-Marne department

References

Communes of Haute-Marne